Siamamia is an extinct genus of ray-finned fish from Northeasthern Thailand. They belong to family Sinamiidae and are halecomorph fishes endemic to Early Cretaceous freshwater environments in eastern Asia.

Siamamia fossils have been found present-day in Phu Phok, Sakhon Nakhon Province, Thailand.

Etymology 
Siam (former name of Thailand), referring to location.
Amia (Greek).
Naga mythological creature in Mekong River

References 

Amiiformes
Prehistoric ray-finned fish genera
Cretaceous bony fish
Early Cretaceous fish of Asia
Taxa named by Varavudh Suteethorn
Taxa named by Éric Buffetaut